Shurcheh may refer to:
 Shurcheh, Fars
 Shurcheh, Borkhar, Isfahan Province
 Shurcheh, Golpayegan, Isfahan Province
 Shurcheh, Lenjan, Isfahan Province
 Shurcheh, Kermanshah
 Shurcheh, Lorestan
 Shurcheh, Razavi Khorasan
 Shurcheh-ye Purgazy, Khash County, Sistan and Baluchestan Province